Robert King Anderson (August 29, 1861 – July 3, 1950) was a Canadian politician, physician and teacher.

Biography
Anderson graduated as a physician from the University of Toronto in 1888, and pursued postgraduate studies in Edinburgh, New York City and Chicago before setting up in practice. On settling in Milton, Ontario, he pursued an interest in local politics, becoming a town councillor in 1904-1907 and Mayor in 1907–1909, as well as being Chairman of the Milton Hydro-Electric Commission for eight years. From 1906, he served in the Canadian Militia with the 20th Halton Rifles as its major and paymaster.

He was elected to the House of Commons of Canada representing the riding of Halton in 1917 and re-elected in 1921, 1925, 1926 and 1930.

Electoral record

		
		

						

Note: Conservative vote is compared to Government vote in 1917 election, and Liberal vote is compared to Opposition vote.

Note: Government vote is compared to Conservative vote in 1911 election, and Opposition vote is compared to Liberal vote.

References

External links 
 

1861 births
1950 deaths
Canadian educators
Physicians from Ontario
Conservative Party of Canada (1867–1942) MPs
Members of the House of Commons of Canada from Ontario
Mayors of places in Ontario